3-hydroxypropionyl-CoA dehydratase is an enzyme with systematic name 3-hydroxypropionyl-CoA hydro-lyase. This enzyme catalyses the following chemical reaction

 3-hydroxypropanoyl-CoA  acrylyl-CoA + H2O

This enzyme catalyses a step in the 3-hydroxypropionate/4-hydroxybutyrate cycle.

References

External links 
 

EC 4.2.1